WBPM (92.9 FM) is a classic hits radio station licensed to Saugerties, New York, serving the Mid-Hudson Valley and Catskills. The station is owned by Pamal Broadcasting and broadcasts at 6,000 watts ERP from a tower in the Town of Kingston, New York, while its studios are in Beacon.

The WBPM calls were previously on 94.3 MHz from 1975 to 2003, that station is today known as WKXP.

History
92.9 MHz, Saugerties, New York was added to the FCC's Table of Allotments in June 1998.  The allotment was applied for and won by then-WRNQ/WKIP/WTND owner Eric Straus. In its preparation to reach the air, its tower site changed from WDST's original tower in Lake Katrine to a defunct AT&T microwave relay tower site in the Town of Kingston, given that a feasibility study showed that from the former very little signal would reach the main target market of Poughkeepsie.

On September 15, 1999, the allotment was assigned the call letters WRKW,  signed on for testing that October 23, and made a full launch on November 1, 1999. WRKW's launch format was a "Rock Adult Contemporary" format called Quality Rock which was automated and jockless outside of the syndicated Bob & Tom morning show. Later a voicetracked PM drive jock and the syndicated weekend show The Beatle Years was added. Considering that the same music was available on the far stronger WPDH, the station struggled to make a showing.

After Clear Channel Communications purchased Straus' stations in 2000, the format remained unchanged until 2002 due to contractual obligations to the firm that programmed the Quality Rock format.  On June 26, 2002, at 10 AM, the station entered a 26-hour-long stunt of Eminem's "Without Me." The next day at Noon, WRKW relaunched as active rock 92.9 Rock. Unlike its predecessor, the station launched with DJ's taken from sister stations and a heavy promotion blitz and quickly became a middle-of-the pack radio station.

In March 2003, the syndicated Waking with the Wolf show began airing on the station. "The Wolf" had been on WPDH for several years before moving to WPYX in Albany, New York. This show did not live up to the station's expectations and was canceled 14 months later when the station changed formats again.

On May 26, 2004, WRKW changed format to oldies as Cool 92.9 and soon thereafter took the WBPM calls which had served nearly three decades on 94.3 FM and with air staff formerly of that station and oldies predecessor WCZX.

In late May 2006, it was announced that WBPM and sister station WGHQ would be swapped to Pamal Broadcasting along with Clear Channel's Rutland, Vermont cluster (WSYB, WZRT) and WPYR in Baton Rouge, Louisiana for WRNX in Amherst, Massachusetts. The deal made WBPM a sister station to market leaders WSPK and WHUD as well as WBNR and WLNA. On February 1, 2007, the station switched from oldies to the station's current format classic hits.

On March 15, 2021, WBPM began to simulcast its classic hits programming on sister Pamal Broadcasting stations WBNR Beacon/Newburgh and WLNA Peekskill. The move was primarily to better utilize the FM Translators associated with the AM signals. The simulcast allows WBPM a larger coverage area including the southern part of the Poughkeepsie metro.
.

Programming
When Pamal took control of the station on February 1, 2007, the station changed to "Classic Hits" at 12:00 p.m. that day after twelve hours of stunting. The programming featured "Classic Rock-leaning hits from 1965-1989."  Currently, the station is programmed by Randy Turner, formerly of WCZX. In October 2011 Bob Miller joined WBPM as Morning Show host (after a long stint at rival WCZX) reuniting  with longtime co-host and newsman Brian Jones. As of September 1, 2012, under the direction of station manager Don Verity,  WBPM features Classic Pop Hits marketed as "The Biggest Hits of All Time" from the 1960s, 1970s and 1980s. WBPM is considered the leading station in Kingston and Ulster County. 
In the 2020s, like many classic hits stations,  the music on the WBPM has evolved away from the 60s to focus on the 70s, 80s, 90s, and early 2000s to accommodate Generation X listeners that are aging into the target demo.

References

External links
WBPM official website
WBPM on Facebook.com
WBPM on Twitter.com

BPM
Classic hits radio stations in the United States
BPM
Radio stations established in 1999
1999 establishments in New York (state)
Pamal Broadcasting